Ben Heaton (born 12 March 1990) is a professional rugby league footballer who plays as a centre, second row or fullback for Oldham (Heritage № 1249) in the RFL Championship.

Club career
Heaton has previously played for Halifax in the Betfred Championship, Oldham and spent time on loan at the Batley Bulldogs.

Oldham (re-joins)
On 30 September 2020, it was reported that he had signed for Oldham in the RFL Championship.

References

External links
Halifax profile

1990 births
Living people
Batley Bulldogs players
English rugby league players
Halifax R.L.F.C. players
Hunslet R.L.F.C. players
Oldham R.L.F.C. players
Place of birth missing (living people)
Rugby league centres
Rugby league fullbacks
Rugby league second-rows